Pygmaepterys rauli is a species of sea snail, a marine gastropod mollusk in the family Muricidae, the murex snails or rock snails.

Description

Distribution
This species occurs in the Caribbean Sea off Cuba.

References

 Espinosa J. (1990). Una especie nueva y adiciones a la fauna cubana de Muricoidea (Mollusca: Neogastropoda). Poeyana. 407: 1-9.

Muricidae
Gastropods described in 1990